Seth Brandon Condrey (born November 24, 1983) is an American Christian musician, who is a GMA Dove Award-winning artist, and a worship leader at North Point Community Church in Alpharetta, Georgia. He has released four Latin Albums, and two English-language albums. The 2007 album, De Corazon a Corazon, won him the 39th GMA Dove Awards for Spanish Language Album of the Year.

Early and personal life
Condrey was born, Seth Brandon Condrey, on November 24, 1983, in Greenville, South Carolina. He was homeschooled, until he went to college, at North Greenville University. His collegiate studies lead him to spend a year in Argentina to attend Bible school. He now spends some of his time spreading the word in San José, Costa Rica, and is married to a Puerto Rican, Jessica Condrey. Seth and his family now reside in Woodstock, Georgia, where Seth is now on staff at Woodstock City Church, a campus of North Point Ministries.

Music career
His music recording career started in 2002 or 2004, with the album, My All. His subsequent album, a Latin album, De Corazon a Corazon, won him a GMA Dove Award at the 39th Annual Awards, for Spanish Language Album of the Year. The third album, also a Latin album, Mi Vida Entera, was released in 2008. He released More Than I See in 2009 with Entertainment One. His next album, En Vivo, was released in 2012, from North Point Music. The latest album, Keeps on Changing, was released in 2013 also via North Point Music. In 2014, he released a Latin EP, Worship Sessions Vol. 1 on North Point Music.

Discography
Studio albums
 My All (2002 or 2004, Latin)
 De Corazon a Corazon (2007, Latin)
 Mi Vida Entera (2008, Latin)
 More Than I See (2009, Entertainment One, English)
 En Vivo (2012, North Point, Latin)
 Keeps on Changing (2013, North Point, English)
EPs
 Worship Sessions Vol. 1 (2014, North Point, Latin)
 Sesiones de Adoracion Vol 2. EP (2016, North Point, Latin)

Singles

References

External links
 Official website
 New Release Today artist profile

1983 births
Living people
American performers of Christian music
Songwriters from South Carolina
Musicians from Greenville, South Carolina